"Bird Set Free" is a song recorded by Sia for her seventh studio album This Is Acting (2016). It was released as the first promotional single from the album on 4 November 2015.

Background
In an interview with Rolling Stone, Sia said that the song was written for Pitch Perfect 2 soundtrack, but they rejected it in favour of "Flashlight". Afterwards she pitched it to Rihanna, who rejected it, then to Adele, who initially recorded it for her album 25, but later decided to let Sia keep it.

Composition
"Bird Set Free" is a piano-based power ballad written in the key of F minor.

Critical reception
Rolling Stone said the song is "liberating". In a review of the song's parent album This Is Acting, Kathy Iandolf of Idolator wrote "This album is dark, indicated by the lead single 'Alive,' but also by the opener 'Bird Set Free,' where Sia takes a solemn vow to emotional liberation amidst strong piano keys." Alex McCown of The A.V. Club called it the "best female empowerment sing-along Katy Perry never wrote." Calling the song a "ginormo self-empowerment anthem", Hugh Montgomory of The Independent wrote "Sia produces something more complex, battle-cries from a volatile soul."

Promotion
Sia performed "Bird Set Free" and "Alive" on the 7 November 2015 episode of Saturday Night Live.

Usage in media
"Bird Set Free" was featured over the end credits of the horror film The Shallows. It was also featured in the opening credits of the 2017 film Unforgettable.

Charts

Certifications

References

External links

2010s ballads
2015 songs
Pop ballads
Sia (musician) songs
Songs written by Greg Kurstin
Songs written by Sia (musician)
Song recordings produced by Greg Kurstin